Alice in Wonderland is action-adventure video game published by Disney Interactive Studios. Based on Tim Burton's 2010 film of the same name, it was released in the same week as the film for the Wii, Nintendo DS, Microsoft Windows and Zeebo, with the soundtrack being composed by video game music composer Richard Jacques. The Wii, DS, and PC versions were released on March 2, 2010. The DS game is completely different from the Wii and PC versions.

Actors who reprised their roles from the film include Mia Wasikowska (as Alice Kingsleigh), Crispin Glover (as Ilosovic Stayne, the Knave of Hearts), Michael Sheen (as Nivens McTwisp the White Rabbit), Barbara Windsor (as Mallymkun the Dormouse), Stephen Fry (as Cheshire), and Leo Bill (as Hamish Ascot).

Gameplay

Wii Version
Alice in Wonderland allows players to guide, protect and aid Alice as she journeys through the world of Wonderland while unraveling the game's many twisted mysteries. Along the way, players call on a diverse and unique cast of characters such as the Mad Hatter and Cheshire Cat who each have unique abilities to help evade traps and solve challenging puzzles. The Mad Hatter can help Alice alter her perception of Wonderland and take advantage of optical illusions to open up places in the world the player alone would not have noticed. Meanwhile, the Cheshire Cat can use his ability to make himself and objects appear and disappear helping Alice through this strange world. Players must choose wisely when using each of the characters' powers and combine the abilities to solve more complex puzzles.

DS Version

The DS version of the game is quite different from the Wii and PC. It is highly stylized, some characters have different abilities and it is a side-scroller. Absolem is also a playable character where in the other versions he is a NPC. Again you must guide Alice though Wonderland to eventually face the Jabberwocky.

Reception

The game was met with mostly positive reception upon release.  GameRankings and Metacritic gave it a score of 78.82% and 78 out of 100 for the DS version; 70.50% and 69 out of 100 for the Wii version; and 63 out of 100 for the PC version.

GameZone's Michael Lafferty gave the Wii version of the game a 7.5 rating out of 10, saying, "Graphically this game scores well, and though the overall gameplay is nothing that has not been experienced before, the game still has a nice rhythm to it. It is what it is – a game adaptation of a movie, slightly offbeat, but accessible." On the other hand, GameSpot gave the game a 6 out of 10 "fair" rating. It noted some of the game's puzzle mechanics and "variety" as good points, while repetitive combat, bad voice acting, visual unevenness, and poor multiplayer were bad points. In comparison, the DS version of the game fared well, earning an 8.5 out of 10 or "Great" rating. For the DS, GameSpot criticized the combat and the occasional experience of not knowing what to do next. However, GameSpot praised the "visual direction," puzzles, characterization, humor, cleverness, and DSi features.

References

External links
 

2010 video games
Action-adventure games
Alice in Wonderland (franchise)
Disney video games
Metroidvania games
Nintendo DS games
Single-player video games
Video games about rabbits and hares
Video games based on adaptations
Video games based on Alice in Wonderland
Video games based on films
Video games based on works by Tim Burton
Video games developed in France
Video games scored by Richard Jacques
3D platform games
Wii games
Windows games
Zeebo games
Étranges Libellules games
Video games with alternative versions